Stephen Pearton is an American materials scientist, engineer, and Distinguished Professor at the University of Florida. Pearton's work focuses on the use of advanced materials in areas such as laser diodes, nanomaterial applications, and similar applications.

Pearton is a recipient of the J.J. Ebers Award from the Institute of Electrical and Electronics Engineers, and the David Adler Lectureship Award in the Field of Materials Physics from the American Physical Society. He is also a Fellow of multiple professional or academic societies, including the Institute of Electrical and Electronics Engineers, the American Physical Society, the Materials Research Society, and the American Vacuum Society.

References 

University of Florida faculty
American materials scientists
21st-century American engineers
Living people
Year of birth missing (living people)
Place of birth missing (living people)
Fellows of the Minerals, Metals & Materials Society